The 2005 Nextel All-Star Challenge was the second exhibition stock car race of the 2005 NASCAR Nextel Cup Series season and the 21st iteration of the event. The race was held on Saturday, May 21, 2005, in Concord, North Carolina at Lowe's Motor Speedway, a 1.5 miles (2.4 km) permanent quad-oval. The race took the scheduled 90 laps to complete. At race's end, Mark Martin of Roush Racing would hold off the field in the final segment to win the million dollar prize and his second Nextel All-Star Challenge win.

Background 

Lowe's Motor Speedway is a motorsports complex located in Concord, North Carolina, United States 13 miles from Charlotte, North Carolina. The complex features a 1.5 miles (2.4 km) quad oval track that hosts NASCAR racing including the prestigious Coca-Cola 600 on Memorial Day weekend and the NEXTEL All-Star Challenge, as well as the UAW-GM Quality 500. The speedway was built in 1959 by Bruton Smith and is considered the home track for NASCAR with many race teams located in the Charlotte area. The track is owned and operated by Speedway Motorsports Inc. (SMI) with Marcus G. Smith (son of Bruton Smith) as track president.

Format and eligibility 
The 90 laps of the Nextel All-Star Challenge was divided into three segments. Caution laps between segment breaks were not counted. The first segment was 40 laps long. Mandatory 10-minute pit stops/breaks were implemented in between both segment breaks. During the first 10-minute break, a random ping pong ball (each ball would have one NASCAR on Fox announcer or pit reporter on it) picked by Chris Myers would lead Myers to open a giant, promotional Nextel flip phone of the corresponding announcer. Each phone had a number that would decide how many cars would be inverted to start Segment 2, a 30-lap segment. After the second 10-minute break, drivers would race in a 20-lap shootout to decide the winner of the Nextel All-Star Challenge.

Drivers who had won in the previous season and the first 11 eleven races of the current season were automatically eligible to qualify for the Nextel All-Star Challenge. In addition, previous champions and former Nextel All-Star Challenge winners within the last 10 years (1995-2004) were also automatically eligible.

Teams who were not automatically eligible to qualify, but still wanted to have a chance at entering the Nextel All-Star Challenge were made to race in a qualifying race called the Nextel Open, a 30-lap shootout event where the winner of the event would qualify to race in the Nextel All-Star Challenge. Teams who were in the Top 50 in the 2004 NASCAR Nextel Cup Series owner's points standings were allowed to race in the Nextel Open. In addition, a televote was made open to the public where the driver who got the most votes from the public would also qualify to move on to the Nextel All-Star Challenge.

Entry list

Nextel Open

Nextel All-Star Challenge

Practice

Nextel Open practice 
While there were two scheduled Nextel Open practices, the first practice was delayed by rain, leading to the cancellation of the second session.

The only 45-minute practice session was held on Friday, May 20 at 1:15 PM EST.

Nextel All-Star Challenge practice 
The only 45-minute practice session was held on Friday, May 20 at 2:15 PM EST.

Qualifying

Nextel Open 
Qualifying for the Nextel Open was held on Friday, May 20, at 6:05 PM EST. Each driver would have two laps to set a fastest time; the fastest of the two would count as their official qualifying lap.

In qualifying, two drivers would fail to make a lap due to a crash: Scott Riggs would spin on the backstretch and hit the wall, and Jason Leffler would slam the Turn 3 wall after getting loose entering the corner.

Nextel All-Star Challenge 
Qualifying for the Nextel All-Star Challenge was held on Friday, May 20, at 7:10 PM EST. Each driver would run 3 laps each, with each driver having to do a mandatory pit stop within those three laps.

*Won the Nextel Open to qualify.

**Won the fan vote to qualify.

NASCAR Pit Crew Challenge 
The inaugural NASCAR Pit Crew Challenge was announced during the week of the race. Kasey Kahne's team, owned by Evernham Motorsports would win the challenge.

Format and eligibility 
To be eligible to compete, a team either had to win a race in 2004 or 2005, win a previous Nextel All-Star Challenge race, or have won the championship within the last 10 years. The Nextel Open and Fan Vote winners from the 2004 Nextel All-Star Challenge were automatically eligible to enter. While 20 teams were scheduled to compete, Terry Labonte would withdraw, leaving three spots to be allocated by owner's points.

24 teams would compete in a tournament-style bracket with four rounds.

Round 1 
Round 1 would consist of the 24 teams racing against the clock, two teams at a time, in an individual skills/team competition. The teams with the fastest eight overall team times would move on to Round 2.

There were 4 skills that each team had to individually accomplish with their respective members, along with one team exercise at the end:

Front Tire Changer and Front Tire Carrier: The front tire changer and carriers will start from outside the pit box, attacking the right side of the car first, then moving onto the left. The second tire will be pre-positioned by the carrier at the pit wall. Competitors will use their own air guns, and a five second time penalty will be administered for any lugs not properly installed. Tire changer must hit split timer button on exit of pit box.

Rear Tire Changer and Rear Tire Carrier: The rear tire changer and carriers will start from outside the pit box, attacking the right side of the car first, then moving onto the left. The second tire will be pre-positioned by the carrier at the pit wall. Competitors will use their own air guns, and a five second time penalty will be administered for any lugs not properly installed. Tire changer must hit split timer button on exit of pit box.

Gas Man: The gas man and catch can man will be responsible for filling a car with 18 gallons of non-flammable liquid, using two pre-loaded nine gallon cans. Gas men will start with one fuel can in hand from just over the wall near the left rear of the car, and will be timed through setting the second can down. If the fuel cans are not empty, the competitor will receive a time penalty. The gas man must hit the split timer on exit of pit box.

Jack Man: The jack man, using his own jack, must jack each side of the car high enough to lift both tires off the ground. A NASCAR Nextel Cup Series official will signal when the tires on each side of the car are off the ground. The jack man must start from outside of the pit box with his hands off the jack and must set off each light before hitting the split timer button and leaving his pit box.

40 Yard Push: As soon as each team member finishes their respective station, they can go to the center of the Charlotte Coliseum, where a special 40-yard lane is created. Each team will get to push their own 3,200 pound (without driver) race car across the finish line. Timing will begin when the car starts to move, finishing when the nose of the racing machine crosses the electronic finish line.

Round 2 
The eight teams that moved on from Round 1 would go against each other, with seeds being based on overall team time. Round 2 would have each team doing the same challenge as Round 1. The team who won against the other would move on to Round 3.

Round 3 
The four teams that moved on from Round 2 would face off in the semifinals. In this round, the teams would perform a regular four-tire pit stop- whoever won their respective battle would move on to the final.

Round 4 
The two teams that moved on from Round 3 would face off in the final. Similar to Round 3, the teams would perform a regular four-tire pit stop- whoever won the final won the challenge.

Bracket

Race recap

Nextel Open 
Mike Bliss would take the lead on the start, but the racing would be short lived as Scott Riggs got loose and slammed the wall in the middle of Turns 3-4, ending his day.

The race would restart on Lap 5, with Travis Kvapil stealing the lead on the outside from Bliss on the restart. However, just three laps later, Morgan Shepherd would blow a tire and destroy the right side of his car, ending his day and dealing a major financial blow to Shepherd's team, Shepherd Racing Ventures. During the break, some teams would decide to take four tires, including Kyle Busch.

The race would restart on Lap 12, with Kvapil and Bliss in a fierce battle for the lead, with Bliss eventually besting Kvapil on the restart. However, Kvapil would stay within reach of Bliss and retake the lead on Lap 14. Kvapil would be able to hang on to the lead until Lap 20, when the first segment ended.

During the caution, everyone but the Top 4 and Kyle Busch would make pit stops. Bobby Hamilton Jr. would lead the cycle.

Bliss would once again lead the field, taking the lead from Kvapil on the high side. Three cars, Bliss, Kvapil, and Brian Vickers, relatively untalked about all day, would pull away from the rest of the field. The three coming to six to go would all be very close to each other, with each on their bumper. Kvapil would try and make a move coming to 5 to go, but would fail. Vickers would manage to pass Kvapil coming to four to go. Vickers and Bliss would pull away from Kvapil, and battle to the end to enter the Nextel All-Star Challenge. Vickers would slowly manage to pull in Bliss, with Vickers running a lower line than Bliss. Coming to the white flag, Bliss would get a run. However, coming into turn one, Bliss would run a lower side than Vickers, making Vickers have a run on Bliss. Bliss would throw a block coming into Turn 3, killing Vickers' momentum. Vickers would once again run a lower line than Bliss, but couldn't get to Bliss' door. Coming out of the turn, Vickers was on his bumper, but wasn't on his door, seeming like Bliss would take the win. However, at the last second, Bliss would throw a late block on Vickers, hitting Vickers' bumper and causing Bliss to spin, causing Bliss to finish by sliding through the grass. In the short distance to the finish, Vickers would pass the spinning Bliss and win the Nextel Open, guaranteeing Vickers a spot in the Nextel All-Star Challenge.

Nextel All-Star Challenge

Nextel Open results

Nextel All-Star Challenge results

References 

2005 NASCAR Nextel Cup Series
NASCAR races at Charlotte Motor Speedway
May 2005 sports events in the United States
2005 in sports in North Carolina